Golokhvastovo is a village in Novofyodorovskoye Settlement, Troitsky Administrative Okrug of the federal city of Moscow, Russia. Population:

References

Rural localities in Moscow (federal city)
Troitsky Administrative Okrug